The 2014 Gardner–Webb Runnin' Bulldogs football team represented Gardner–Webb University in the 2014 NCAA Division I FCS football season. They were led by second-year head coach Carroll McCray and played their home games at Ernest W. Spangler Stadium. They were a member of the Big South Conference. They finished the season 4–8, 0–5 in Big South play to finish in last place.

Schedule

Source: Schedule

References

Gardner-Webb
Gardner–Webb Runnin' Bulldogs football seasons
Gardner-Webb Runnin' Bulldogs f